UEFI Forum, Inc. is an alliance between technology companies to coordinate the development of the UEFI specifications. The board of directors includes representatives from twelve promoter companies: AMD, American Megatrends, ARM, Apple, Dell, Hewlett Packard Enterprise, HP Inc., Insyde Software, Intel, Lenovo, Microsoft, and Phoenix Technologies.

Overview 
The non-profit corporation has assumed responsibility for the management and promotion of the Unified Extensible Firmware Interface (UEFI) specification, a bootloader and runtime interface between platform firmware and an operating system. The original EFI specification was developed by Intel and was used as the starting point from which the UEFI version(s) were developed. The goal of the organization is to replace the aging PC BIOS.

In addition to the UEFI specification, the forum is responsible for a UEFI Platform Initialization (PI) specification, which addresses the firmware internal architecture as well as firmware-to-hardware interfaces. The forum also is responsible for Self-Certification Test suites, which defines conformance to the specifications that it defines.

In October 2013, the Advanced Configuration and Power Interface (ACPI) assets have also been transferred into the forum. The forum is responsible for the management and promotion of future ACPI specifications, which provides static tables at boot time and dynamic control methods as the primary runtime interfaces between the OS and system firmware for system configuration, power management and RAS (Reliability, Availability and Supportability) features. ACPI "Revision 5.0" is used as the starting point from which future ACPI version(s) will be developed.

Published specifications 
 UEFI Specification version 2.8, published March, 2019
 UEFI Shell Specification version 2.2, published January 26, 2016
 UEFI Platform Initialization Specification version 1.7, published January, 2019
 UEFI Platform Initialization Distribution Packaging Specification version 1.1, published January, 2016
 ACPI Specification version 6.4, published January 2021

Obsolete specifications 
 UEFI Specification version 2.0, 2.1, 2.2
 UEFI Platform Initialization Specification version 1.0, 1.1

See also 
 TianoCore EDK II
 ACPI Component Architecture (ACPICA)
 Distributed Management Task Force (DMTF)

References

External links 
 
 Fedora UEFI support
 Microsoft Windows UEFI support
 Book - Beyond BIOS 
 Book - Harnessing the UEFI Shell
 Book Chapter - UEFI:  From Reset Vector to Operating System
 Book - Beyond BIOS, 2nd edition, updated with UEFI2.3 and PI1.2
 Intel Technology Journal, Volume 15, Issue 01 - "UEFI Today: Bootstrapping the Continuum"

BIOS
Unified Extensible Firmware Interface